Ylvis: Volume I is the only album by the comedy duo Ylvis. It consists of 10 songs that Ylvis originally released as singles and then put together into one album. The album was released on 19 November 2014 through Universal Music AS. It peaked at number 24 in Norway.

Track listing

Charts

References

2014 albums
Albums produced by Stargate
Universal Music Group albums
2010s comedy albums
Pop albums by Norwegian artists